This is a list of Super Bowl records. The list of records is separated by individual players and teams. Players and teams, along with their records, are noted with the Super Bowl game played. All records can be referenced at the National Football League (NFL)'s official website, NFL.com.

Individual player records
A complete list of Super Bowl records can be found in the 2022 Official NFL Record & Fact Book beginning at page 659.  Records can also be found at Pro-Football-Reference.com.

Service
Most Super Bowl wins: 7
Tom Brady – QB
Patriots (XXXVI, XXXVIII, XXXIX, XLIX, LI, LIII)
Buccaneers (LV)
Most Super Bowl MVP awards: 5
Tom Brady – QB
Patriots (XXXVI, XXXVIII, XLIX, LI) 
Buccaneers (LV) 
Most losses: 5
Glenn Parker – OL
Bills (XXV, XXVI, XXVII, XXVIII)
Giants (XXXV)
Cornelius Bennett – LB
Bills (XXV, XXVI, XXVII, XXVIII)
Falcons (XXXIII)
Gale Gilbert – QB
Bills (XXV, XXVI, XXVII, XXVIII)
Chargers (XXIX)
Most consecutive championships: 3
Ken Norton Jr. – LB
Cowboys (XXVII, XXVIII)
49ers (XXIX)
Back to back championships with different teams
Ken Norton Jr. – LB
Cowboys (XXVII, XXVIII)
 49ers (XXIX).
Deion Sanders – CB
49ers (XXIX)
 Cowboys (XXX).
Derrick Martin - S
Packers (XLV)
Giants (XLVI)
Brandon Browner – CB
Seahawks (XLVIII)
Patriots (XLIX)
Chris Long – DE 
Patriots (LI)
Eagles (LII)
LeGarrette Blount – RB
Patriots (LI)
Eagles (LII)
LeSean McCoy – RB
Chiefs (LIV)
Buccaneers (LV)
Kendall Blanton – TE
Rams (LVI)
Chiefs (LVII)
 Win a Super Bowl in three different decades
Tom Brady – QB
2000's: Patriots (XXXVI, XXXVIII, XXXIX)
2010's: Patriots (XLIX, LI, LIII)
 2020's: Buccaneers (LV)
Win a Super Bowl with one team and then defeat that same team in the Super Bowl the following season
Brandon Browner – CB
Seahawks (XLVIII)
 Patriots (XLIX)
Chris Long – DE
 Patriots (LI)
 Eagles (LII)
LeGarrette Blount – RB
 Patriots (LI)
Eagles (LII)
LeSean McCoy – RB
Chiefs (LIV)
Buccaneers (LV)
Longest time span between Super Bowl championships as a player: 12 seasons
Ray Lewis – LB
Baltimore Ravens (XXXV, XLVII)
Most appearances as either a player or coach: 12
Bill Belichick
 Giants – Assistant coach (XXI, XXV)
Patriots – Assistant coach (XXXI)
Patriots – Head coach (XXXVI, XXXVIII, XXXIX, XLII, XLVI, XLIX, LI, LII, LIII)
Most games played: 10
Tom Brady – QB 
Patriots (XXXVI, XXXVIII, XXXIX, XLII, XLVI, XLIX, LI, LII, LIII)
Buccaneers (LV)
Most games started: 10
Tom Brady – QB
Patriots (XXXVI, XXXVIII, XXXIX, XLII, XLVI, XLIX, LI, LII, LIII)
Buccaneers (LV)
Most consecutive appearances:  5
Gale Gilbert – QB
Bills (XXV, XXVI, XXVII, XXVIII)
Chargers (XXIX)
Most starts as quarterback:  10
Tom Brady
Patriots (XXXVI, XXXVIII, XXXIX, XLII, XLVI, XLIX, LI, LII, LIII)
Buccaneers (LV)
Most wins as starting quarterback: 7
Tom Brady
 Patriots (XXXVI, XXXVIII, XXXIX, XLIX, LI, LIII) 
Buccaneers (LV)
Wins as starting quarterback for two different teams
Peyton Manning
Colts (XLI)
Broncos (50)
Tom Brady
Patriots (XXXVI, XXXVIII, XXXIX, XLIX, LI, LIII) 
Buccaneers (LV)
Most games as a kicker: 6
Stephen Gostkowski
Patriots (XLII, XLVI, XLIX, LI, LII, LIII)
Most wins as a kicker: 4
Adam Vinatieri
Patriots (XXXVI, XXXVIII, XXXIX) 
Colts (XLI) 
Oldest player: 43 years, 199 days
Tom Brady – QB
Buccaneers (LV)
Youngest player to start: 21 years, 322 days
Bryan Bulaga – OL
Packers (XLV)
 Quarterbacks to both throw and catch a touchdown pass 
Nick Foles
Eagles (LII)
Oldest quarterback to start and to win: 43 years 6 months and 4 days
Tom Brady
Buccaneers (LV)
Youngest quarterback to start and to win: 23 years and 340 days
Ben Roethlisberger
Steelers (XL)

Scoring
Most points scored, career, 48
Jerry Rice – San Francisco XXIII, XXIV, XXIX, and Oakland XXXVII
Most points scored, single game, 20
James White – New England vs. Atlanta, LI - 3 TD, 1 (2-point) conversion
Jalen Hurts – Philadelphia vs. Kansas City, LVII - 3 TD, 1 (2-point) conversion
Longest scoring play, 108 yard kickoff return
Jacoby Jones – Baltimore vs. San Francisco, XLVII

Touchdowns
 In this category R = rushing touchdown (TD); P = pass reception TD; KR = kickoff return TD
Most touchdowns, career, 8
Jerry Rice – San Francisco XXIII, XXIV, XXIX, and Oakland XXXVII (8-P)
Most touchdowns, QB-Receiver Tandem, career, 5
Tom Brady-Rob Gronkowski  – New England XLVI, XLIX, LI, LII, LIII, and Tampa Bay LV
Most touchdowns, single game, 3 (accomplished seven times by six players)
Roger Craig – San Francisco vs. Miami, XIX (1-R, 2-P)
Jerry Rice – San Francisco vs. Denver, XXIV (3-P)
Jerry Rice – San Francisco vs. San Diego, XXIX (3-P)
Ricky Watters – San Francisco vs. San Diego, XXIX (1-R, 2-P)
Terrell Davis – Denver vs. Green Bay, XXXII (3-R)
James White – New England vs. Atlanta, LI (2-R, 1-P)
Jalen Hurts - Philadelphia vs. Kansas City, LVII (3-R)
Most touchdowns, single quarter, 2
Dan Ross – Cincinnati vs. San Francisco, XVI (2-P)
Marcus Allen – Los Angeles Raiders vs. Washington, XVIII (2-R)
Roger Craig – San Francisco vs. Miami, XIX (1-R, 1-P)
Ricky Sanders – Washington vs. Denver, XXII (2-P)
Michael Irvin – Dallas vs. Buffalo, XXVII (2-P)
Larry Fitzgerald – Arizona vs. Pittsburgh, XLIII (2-P)
Damien Williams – Kansas City vs. San Francisco, LIV (1-R, 1-P)
Most touchdowns, plays of 50-or-more yards, game, 2
Ricky Sanders – Washington vs. Denver, XXII (2-P)
Jacoby Jones – Baltimore Ravens vs. San Francisco, XLVII (1-P, 1-KR)
Touchdowns scored for two different teams, 4 players
Jerry Rice – San Francisco XXIII, Oakland XXXVII
Ricky Proehl – St. Louis Rams XXXVI, Carolina XXXVIII
Muhsin Muhammad – Carolina XXXVIII, Chicago XLI
Rob Gronkowski – New England XLIX, LII; Tampa Bay LV
Longest play, 108 yards
Jacoby Jones – KR, Baltimore Ravens vs. San Francisco, XLVII

Passing
Highest passer rating, career, (40 attempts), 127.83
Joe Montana – 4 games, San Francisco XVI, XIX, XXIII, XXIV 
Highest passer rating, game, 150.92
Phil Simms – New York Giants vs. Denver, XXI
Lowest passer rating to win game, 22.6
Ben Roethlisberger – Pittsburgh vs. Seattle, XL
Most touchdown passes, career, 21
Tom Brady – 10 games, New England XXXVI, XXXVIII, XXXIX, XLII, XLVI, XLIX, LI, LII, LIII; Tampa Bay LV
Most touchdown passes, half, 4
Doug Williams, first half – Washington vs. Denver, XXII
Steve Young, first half – San Francisco vs. San Diego, XXIX
Most touchdown passes, quarter, 4 (second)
Doug Williams – Washington vs. Denver, XXII
Most touchdown passes, game, 6
Steve Young - San Francisco vs. San Diego, XXIX
Lowest percentage, passes had intercepted, career, (40 attempts), 0.00%
Jim Plunkett, Oakland/Los Angeles Raiders, 2 games (46–0), XV, XVIII 
Joe Montana, San Francisco, 4 games (122–0), XVI, XIX, XXIII, XXIV 
Most attempts, career, 421
Tom Brady – 10 games, New England XXXVI, XXXVIII, XXXIX, XLII, XLVI, XLIX, LI, LII, LIII; Tampa Bay LV
Most attempts, game, 62
Tom Brady – New England vs Atlanta, LI
Fewest attempts by winning QB, game, 7
Bob Griese – Miami vs. Minnesota, VIII
Most completions, career, 277
Tom Brady – 10 games, New England XXXVI, XXXVIII, XXXIX, XLII, XLVI, XLIX, LI, LII, LIII; Tampa Bay LV
Most completions to start a game, 9
Eli Manning – New York Giants vs. New England, XLVI
Most consecutive completions, game, 16
Tom Brady – New England vs. New York Giants, XLVI
Most completions, game, 43
Tom Brady – New England vs. Atlanta, LI
Most completions, both quarterbacks, 63
Drew Brees – New Orleans (32) vs. Peyton Manning – Indianapolis (31), XLIV
Fewest completions by winning QB, game, 6
Bob Griese – Miami vs. Minnesota, VIII
Highest completion percentage, career, (40 attempts), 70% 
Troy Aikman – Dallas, 3 games (80–56) XXVII, XXVIII, XXX
Highest completion percentage, game, (20 attempts), 88% 
Phil Simms – New York Giants vs. Denver, XXI (22-25)
Highest completion percentage, both teams, 75% (84–63)
Drew Brees, New Orleans vs. Peyton Manning, Indianapolis XLIV
Most passing yards, career, 3,039
Tom Brady – 10 games, New England XXXVI, XXXVIII, XXXIX, XLII, XLVI, XLIX, LI, LII, LIII; Tampa Bay LV
Most passing yards, game, 505
Tom Brady – New England vs. Philadelphia, LII
Most passing yards, quarter, 228 (second)
Doug Williams – Washington vs. Denver, XXII
Longest pass, 85 yards (TD)
Jake Delhomme (to Muhsin Muhammad) – Carolina vs. New England, XXXVIII 
 Fewest passing yards by a Super Bowl MVP, 119
Roger Staubach – Dallas vs. Miami, VI
Highest average gain, career (40 attempts), 11.10 yards
Terry Bradshaw – Pittsburgh, 4 games (84–932), IX, X, XIII, XIV
Highest average gain, game (20 attempts), 14.71 yards
Terry Bradshaw – Pittsburgh vs. Los Angeles Rams, XIV (21–309)
Most attempts, without interception, game,  48
Tom Brady – New England vs. New York Giants, XLII, New England vs. Philadelphia Eagles, LII
Most interceptions thrown, career, 8
John Elway – Denver, 5 games, XXI, XXII, XXIV, XXXII, XXXIII
Most interceptions thrown, game, 5
Rich Gannon – Oakland vs. Tampa Bay, XXXVII

Rushing
Most attempts, career, 101
Franco Harris – Pittsburgh IX, X, XIII, and XIV
Most attempts, game, 38
John Riggins – Washington vs. Miami, XVII
Most rushing yards, career, 354
Franco Harris – Pittsburgh IX, X, XIII, and XIV
Most rushing yards, game, 204
Timmy Smith – Washington vs. Denver, XXII
Longest run from scrimmage, 75 yards (TD)
Willie Parker – Pittsburgh vs. Seattle, XL
Most rushing touchdowns, career, 5
Emmitt Smith – Dallas XXVII, XXVIII, and XXX
Most rushing touchdowns, game, 3
Terrell Davis – Denver vs. Green Bay, XXXII
Jalen Hurts - Philadelphia vs. Kansas City, LVII
Highest average gain, career (20 attempts), 9.6 yards
Marcus Allen – Los Angeles Raiders, 1 game (20–191) XVIII
Highest average gain, game (10 attempts), 10.5 yards
Tom Matte – Baltimore Colts vs. New York Jets, III (11–116)
Longest Touchdown Run, Quarterback, 15 yards
Colin Kaepernick – San Francisco vs. Baltimore Ravens, XLVII
Most rushing yards, game, Quarterback, 70 yards
Jalen Hurts – Philadelphia vs. Kansas City, LVII
Most rushing yards, game, Wide Receiver, 53 yards
Deebo Samuel – San Francisco vs. Kansas City LIV

Receiving
Most receptions, career, 33
Jerry Rice – San Francisco XXIII, XXIV, XXIX; Oakland XXXVII
Most receptions, game, 14
James White – New England vs. Atlanta, LI
Most receiving yards, career, 589
Jerry Rice – San Francisco XXIII, XXIV, XXIX; Oakland XXXVII
Most receiving yards, game, 215
Jerry Rice – San Francisco vs. Cincinnati, XXIII
Most receiving yards, game, tight end, 133
Travis Kelce – Kansas City vs. Tampa Bay, LV
Most receiving yards, game, running back, 110
James White – New England vs. Atlanta, LI
Longest reception, 85 yards (TD)
Muhsin Muhammad – (from Delhomme), Carolina vs. New England, XXXVIII (TD)
Highest average gain, career (8 receptions), 24.4 yards
John Stallworth – Pittsburgh, 4 games (11–268)
Highest average gain, game (3 receptions), 40.33 yards
John Stallworth – Pittsburgh vs. Los Angeles Rams, XIV (3–121)
Most receiving touchdowns, career, 8
Jerry Rice – San Francisco XXIII, XXIV, XXIX; Oakland XXXVII
Most receiving touchdowns, game, 3
Jerry Rice – San Francisco vs. Denver, XXIV
Jerry Rice – San Francisco vs. San Diego, XXIX
Most receiving touchdowns, game, Quarterback, 1
Nick Foles – New England vs. Philadelphia, LII

Combined yardage
This category includes rushing, receiving, interception returns, punt returns, kickoff returns, and fumble returns.
Most Attempts, career, 108
Franco Harris – Pittsburgh, 4 games IX, X, XIII, XIV
Most Attempts, game, 39
John Riggins – Washington vs. Miami, XVII
Most yards gained, career, 604
Jerry Rice – 4 games San Francisco XXIII, XXIV, XXIX; Oakland XXXVII
Most yards gained, game, 290
Jacoby Jones – Baltimore Ravens vs. San Francisco, XLVII

Fumbles
Most fumbles, career, 5
Roger Staubach – Dallas 4 games VI, X, XII, XIII
Tom Brady – 10 games, New England XXXVI, XXXVIII, XXXIX, XLII, XLVI, XLIX, LI, LII, LIII; Tampa Bay LV
Most fumbles, game, 3
Roger Staubach – Dallas vs. Pittsburgh, X
Jim Kelly – Buffalo vs. Washington, XXVI
Frank Reich – Buffalo vs. Dallas, XXVII
Most fumbles recovered, career, 2
Jake Scott, Miami, 3 games (1 own, 1 opponent)
Fran Tarkenton, Minnesota, 3 games (2 own)
Franco Harris, Pittsburgh, 4 games (2 own)
Roger Staubach, Dallas, 4 games (2 own)
Bobby Walden, Pittsburgh, 2 games (2 own)
John Fitzgerald, Dallas, 4 games (2 own)
Randy Hughes, Dallas, 3 games (2 opponent)
Butch Johnson, Dallas, 2 games (2 own)
Mike Singletary, Chicago, 1 game (2 opponent)
John Elway, Denver, 5 games (2 own)
Jimmie Jones, Dallas, 2 games (2 opponent)
Kenneth Davis, Buffalo, 4 games (2 own)
Kurt Warner, St. Louis Rams – Arizona, 3 games (2 own)
Danny Trevathan, Denver, 2 games (1 own, 1 opponent)
Patrick Mahomes, Kansas City,  3 games (2 own)
Most fumbles recovered, game, 2
Jake Scott  – Miami vs. Minnesota, VIII (1 own, 1 opponent)
Roger Staubach – Dallas vs. Pittsburgh, X (2 own)
Randy Hughes – Dallas vs. Denver, XII (2 opponent)
Butch Johnson – Dallas vs. Denver, XII (2 own)
Mike Singletary – Chicago vs. New England, XX (2 opponent)
Jimmie Jones – Dallas vs. Buffalo, XXVII (2 opponent)
Danny Trevathan – Denver vs. Carolina, 50 (1 own, 1 opponent)
Most fumble return yards, game, 64 yards
Leon Lett – Dallas vs. Buffalo, XXVII
Longest fumble return, 64 yards
Leon Lett – Dallas vs. Buffalo, XXVII
Most fumble returns for touchdowns, game, 1
Mike Bass – Washington vs. Miami, VII (opponent 49 yards)
Mike Hegman – Dallas vs. Pittsburgh, XIII (opponent 37 yards)
Jimmie Jones – Dallas vs. Buffalo, XXVII (opponent 2 yards)
Ken Norton, Jr. – Dallas vs. Buffalo, XXVII (opponent 9 yards)
James Washington – Dallas vs. Buffalo, XXVIII (opponent 46 yards)
Malik Jackson – Denver vs. Carolina, 50 (opponent end zone)
Nick Bolton –  Kansas City vs Philadelphia, LVII (opponent 36 yards)

Defense
Most interceptions, career, 3
Chuck Howley – Dallas 2 games, V, VI
Rod Martin – Oakland/Los Angeles Raiders 2 games XV, XVIII
Larry Brown – Dallas 3 games XXVII, XXVIII, XXX
Most interceptions, game, 3
Rod Martin – Oakland vs. Philadelphia, XV
Most interception yards gained, career, 108
Darrien Gordon – San Diego XXIX, Denver XXXII, XXXIII, Oakland XXXVII
Most interception yards gained, game, 108
Darrien Gordon – Denver vs. Atlanta, XXXIII
Longest interception return, 100 yards, TD
 James Harrison – Pittsburgh vs. Arizona, XLIII
Most interceptions returned for a touchdown, game, 2
Dwight Smith – Tampa Bay vs. Oakland, XXXVII
Most solo tackles plus assists, game, 18 (11 tackles, 7 assists)
Dan Morgan – Carolina vs. New England, XXXVIII 
Most solo tackles plus assists, career, 34 (30 tackles, 4 assists)
Rodney Harrison – DB
Chargers (XXIX)
Patriots (XXXVIII, XXXIX, XLII)
Most sacks, career, 5 
(Sacks an official statistic since XVII by the NFL, sacks for all games shown by Pro Football Reference.com) 
L. C. Greenwood – Pittsburgh, 4 games IX, X, XIII, XIV
Most sacks, game, 4 
L. C. Greenwood – Pittsburgh vs. Dallas, X
Most safeties, game, 1
Defensive, tackle in end zone
Dwight White – Pittsburgh vs. Minnesota, IX (Was first score of game)
Henry Waechter – Chicago vs. New England, XX
George Martin – New York Giants vs. Denver, XXI
Bruce Smith – Buffalo vs. New York Giants, XXV
Cliff Avril – Seattle vs. Denver, XLVIII (Was first score of game)
Special teams
Blocked punts
Reggie Harrison – Pittsburgh vs. Dallas, X
Punter ran out of end zone
Chris Culliver credited for safety – San Francisco vs. Baltimore Ravens, XLVII

Special teams

Kickoff returns
Longest kickoff return, 108 yards, TD
Jacoby Jones – Baltimore Ravens vs. San Francisco, XLVII
Most kickoff returns, career, 10
Ken Bell – Denver 3 games XXI, XXII, XXIV
Most kickoff returns, game, 8
Andre Coleman – San Diego vs. San Francisco, XXIX
Marcus Knight – Oakland vs. Tampa Bay XXXVII
Most kickoff return yards, career, 283
Fulton Walker – Miami 2 games XVII, XIX
Most kickoff return yards, game, 244
Andre Coleman – San Diego vs. San Francisco, XXIX
Highest kickoff return average, career (4 returns), 42.0 yards
Tim Dwight, Atlanta, 1 game (5–210) XXXIII
Highest kickoff return average, game (3 returns), 47.5 yards
Fulton Walker, Miami vs. Washington, (4–190) XVII
Opening kickoff returned for touchdown, 1 time
Devin Hester – Chicago vs. Indianapolis, XLI
Most kickoff returns for touchdowns, game, 1
Fulton Walker – Miami vs. Washington, XVII
Stanford Jennings – Cincinnati vs. San Francisco, XXIII
Andre Coleman – San Diego vs. San Francisco, XXIX
Desmond Howard – Green Bay vs. New England, XXXI
Tim Dwight – Atlanta vs. Denver, XXXIII
Ron Dixon – New York Giants vs. Baltimore Ravens, XXXV
Jermaine Lewis – Baltimore Ravens vs. New York Giants XXXV
Devin Hester – Chicago vs. Indianapolis, XLI
Jacoby Jones – Baltimore Ravens vs. San Francisco, XLVII
Percy Harvin – Seattle vs. Denver, XLVIII

Kickoffs
Most kickoffs for touchback, 6
Harrison Butker – 7 kickoffs, 6 touchbacks – Kansas City vs. Philadelphia LVII
Jake Elliott – 6 kickoffs, 6 touchbacks – Philadelphia vs. Kansas City LVII

Punting
Players team listed first
Longest punt, 65 yards
Johnny Hekker – Los Angeles Rams vs. New England LIII
Most punts inside 10 yard line, game, 3
Steve Weatherford – New York Giants vs. New England XLVI
Most punts, game, 11
Brad Maynard – New York Giants vs. Baltimore Ravens XXXV
Most punts, career, 17
Mike Eischeid – 3 games Oakland II, Minnesota VIII, IX
Mike Horan – 4 games Denver XXI, XXII, XXIV, St. Louis Rams XXXIV
Highest punting average, career (10 punts), 46.5 yards
Jerrel Wilson, Kansas City 2 games (11–511) – I, IV
Highest punting average, game (4 punts), 50.2 yards
Tom Rouen, Seattle vs. Pittsburgh, (6–301) – XL

Punt returns
Most punt returns, career, 8
Troy Brown – New England 3 games XXXVI, XXXVIII, XXXIX
Julian Edelman - New England 4 games XLVI, XLIX, LI, LIII
Most punt returns, game, 6
Mike Nelms – Washington vs. Miami, XVII
Desmond Howard – Green Bay vs. New England, XXXI
Most fair catches, game, 4
Jermaine Lewis – Baltimore Ravens vs. New York Giants, XXXV
Karl Williams – Tampa Bay vs. Oakland, XXXVII
Most punt return yards gained, career, 94
John Taylor – San Francisco 3 games XXIII, XXIV, XXIX
Most punt return yards gained, game, 90
Desmond Howard – Green Bay vs. New England, XXXI
Longest punt return, 65 yards
Kadarius Toney – Kansas City vs. Philadelphia, LVII
Highest average, punt return yardage, career (4 returns), 15.7 yards
John Taylor, 3 games (6–94) San Francisco XXIII, XXIV, XXIX
Highest average, punt return yardage, game (3 returns), 18.7 yards
John Taylor, San Francisco vs. Cincinnati, (3–56) XXIII
Most punt returns for touchdowns, game, 0
none

Field goals
Most field goals attempted, career, 10
Adam Vinatieri – 5 games New England XXXI, XXXVI, XXXVIII, XXXIX, Indianapolis XLI
Most field goals attempted, game, 5
Jim Turner – New York Jets vs. Baltimore Colts, III
Efren Herrera – Dallas vs. Denver, XII
Most field goals, career, 7
Adam Vinatieri – 5 games New England XXXI, XXXVI, XXXVIII, XXXIX, Indianapolis XLI (10 attempts)
Stephen Gostkowski - 6 games New England XLII, XLVI, XLIX, LI, LII, LIII (9 attempts)
Game winning field goals
Jim O'Brien 0:05 time left – Baltimore Colts vs. Dallas, V
Adam Vinatieri 0:00 time left – New England vs. St. Louis Rams, XXXVI
Adam Vinatieri 0:04 time left – New England vs. Carolina, XXXVIII
Harrison Butker 0:08 time left - Kansas City vs. Philadelphia, LVII
Most field goals, game, 4
Don Chandler – Green Bay vs. Oakland, II
Ray Wersching – San Francisco vs. Cincinnati, XVI
Most 40-plus yard field goals, game, 3
Garrett Hartley – New Orleans Saints vs. Indianapolis XLIV
Longest field goal, 54 yards
Steve Christie – Buffalo vs. Dallas, XXVIII
Shortest field goal, 9 yards
Jim Turner – New York Jets vs. Baltimore Colts III
Mike Clark – Dallas vs. Miami VI
Note: The goal posts were moved to the back of the end zone in 1974. As such, this record cannot be broken. Standard field goal protocol does not currently allow a kick 17 yards or shorter.

Points after touchdown
Most (one point) PATs, career, 13
Adam Vinatieri – (13 attempts) 5 games New England XXXI, XXXVI, XXXVIII, XXXIX, Indianapolis XLI
Most (one point) extra points, game, 7
Mike Cofer – San Francisco vs. Denver, (8 attempts) XXIV
Lin Elliot – Dallas vs. Buffalo, (7 attempts) XXVII
Doug Brien – San Francisco vs. San Diego, (7 attempts) XXIX
Most 2 point conversions, game, 1
Mark Seay – San Diego vs. San Francisco XXIX
Alfred Pupunu – San Diego vs. San Francisco XXIX
Mark Chmura – Green Bay vs. New England XXXI
Kevin Faulk – New England vs. Carolina XXXVIII
Lance Moore – New Orleans vs. Indianapolis XLIV
Antwaan Randle El – Pittsburgh vs. Green Bay XLV
Wes Welker – Denver vs. Seattle XLVIII
Bennie Fowler – Denver vs. Carolina 50
James White - New England vs. Atlanta LI
Danny Amendola - New England vs. Atlanta LI
Jalen Hurts - Philadelphia vs. Kansas City LVII

Team records
All records can be referenced at NFL.com.
Most Super Bowl appearances, 11
New England Patriots XX, XXXI, XXXVI, XXXVIII, XXXIX, XLII, XLVI, XLIX, LI, LII, LIII

Most consecutive Super Bowl appearances, 4
Buffalo Bills XXV, XXVI, XXVII, XXVIII

Most Super Bowl victories, 6
New England Patriots XXXVI, XXXVIII, XXXIX, XLIX, LI, LIII
Pittsburgh Steelers IX, X, XIII, XIV, XL, XLIII

Most consecutive Super Bowl victories, 2 (occurred 8 times)
Green Bay Packers I, II
Miami Dolphins VII, VIII
Pittsburgh Steelers IX, X
Pittsburgh Steelers XIII, XIV
San Francisco 49ers XXIII, XXIV
Dallas Cowboys XXVII, XXVIII
Denver Broncos XXXII, XXXIII
New England Patriots XXXVIII, XXXIX

Most Super Bowl losses, 5
Denver Broncos XII, XXI, XXII, XXIV, XLVIII
New England Patriots XX, XXXI, XLII, XLVI, LII

Most consecutive Super Bowl losses, 4
Buffalo Bills XXV, XXVI, XXVII, XXVIII

Super Bowl win with no home playoff games
Green Bay Packers I – 2 playoff games
Kansas City Chiefs IV – 3 playoff games
Pittsburgh Steelers XL – 4 playoff games
New York Giants XLII – 4 playoff games
Green Bay Packers XLV – 4 playoff games
Tampa Bay Buccaneers Super Bowl LV - 4 playoff games

Most Super Bowl wins without a loss, 2
Baltimore Ravens – XXXV, XLVII
Tampa Bay Buccaneers — XXXVII, LV

Longest Super Bowl win streak, 5 games
San Francisco 49ers – XVI, XIX, XXIII, XXIV, XXIX

Most Super Bowl appearances without a win, 4
Minnesota Vikings IV, VIII, IX, XI
Buffalo Bills XXV, XXVI, XXVII, XXVIII

Most common matchup, 3
Pittsburgh Steelers vs. Dallas Cowboys X, XIII, XXX

Scoring

Points

Single team
Record holder team listed first.
Most points, game, 55
San Francisco vs. Denver, XXIV
Most consecutive points, game, 44
Chicago vs. New England, XX
Most points by a losing team, game, 35
Philadelphia vs. Kansas City, LVII
Fewest points, game, 3
Miami vs. Dallas, VI
Los Angeles Rams vs. New England, LIII
Fewest points by winning team, game, 13
 New England vs. Los Angeles Rams, LIII
Largest margin of victory, 45 points
San Francisco 49ers vs. Denver, (55–10) XXIV
Smallest margin of victory, 1 point
New York Giants vs. Buffalo, (20–19), XXV
Most points scored, first half of play, 35
Washington vs. Denver, XXII
Most points, second half of play, 30
New York Giants vs. Denver, XXI
Most points scored in any quarter of play, 35
Washington vs. Denver, (second quarter), XXII
Most points, first quarter, 14 (by 7 teams)
Miami vs. Minnesota, VIII
Oakland vs. Philadelphia, XV
Dallas vs. Buffalo, XXVII
San Francisco vs. San Diego, XXIX
New England vs. Green Bay, XXXI
Chicago vs. Indianapolis, XLI
Green Bay vs. Pittsburgh, XLV
Most points, second quarter, 35
Washington vs. Denver, XXII
Most points, third quarter, 21
Chicago vs. New England, XX
Most points, fourth quarter, 21
Dallas vs. Buffalo, XXVII
Kansas City vs. San Francisco, LIV
Most points, overtime, 6
New England vs. Atlanta, LI
Largest lead, end of first quarter, 14 points
Miami vs. Minnesota, (14–0), VIII
Oakland vs. Philadelphia, (14–0), XV
Green Bay vs. Pittsburgh, (14–0), XLV
Largest halftime margin, 25 points
 Washington vs. Denver, (35–10), XXII
Largest halftime lead with a shutout, 22 points
 Seattle vs. Denver, XLVIII
Largest lead, end of 3rd quarter, 41 points
Chicago vs. New England, (44–3), XX
Largest comeback, 25 points
 New England vs. Atlanta, LI Patriots behind 28–3. Won 34–28 (OT)
Largest 4th quarter comeback, 19 points
 New England vs. Atlanta, LI Patriots behind 28–9. Won 34–28 (OT)
Largest halftime comeback, 18 points
 New England vs. Atlanta, LI Patriots behind 21–3. Won 34–28 (OT)
Fewest points, first half, 0 (13 times)
Baltimore Colts vs. New York Jets, III
 Minnesota 4 times -vs. Kansas City, IV, vs. Miami, VIII, vs. Pittsburgh, IX, vs. Oakland, XI
 Washington vs. Miami, VII
 Denver 2 times -vs. Dallas, XII, vs. Seattle, XLVIII
 Cincinnati vs. San Francisco, XVI
 Buffalo vs. Washington, XXVI
 Tennessee vs. St. Louis Rams, XXXIV
 New York Giants vs. Baltimore Ravens, XXXV
 Los Angeles Rams vs. New England, LIII
Fewest points, second half, 0 (8 times)
 Kansas City vs. Green Bay, I
 Dallas vs. Baltimore Colts, V
 Miami 4 times – vs. Dallas, VI, vs. Washington, VII, vs. Washington, XVII, vs. San Francisco, XIX  Super Bowl VII was the only time that a team failed to score in the second half and won.
 Denver vs. Washington, XXII
 Buffalo vs. Dallas, XXVIII

Both teams
Most points, game, 75
San Francisco (49) vs. San Diego (26), XXIX
Fewest points, game, 16
New England (13) vs. Los Angeles Rams (3), LIII
Most points, first half, 45
Washington (35) vs. Denver (10), XXII
Most points, second half, 46
Tampa Bay Buccaneers (28) vs. Oakland Raiders (18), XXXVII
Fewest points, first half, 2
 Pittsburgh Steelers (2) vs. Minnesota Vikings (0), IX
Fewest points, second half, 7 
 Miami Dolphins (0) vs. Washington (7), VII
 Washington (7) vs. Denver (0), XXII
Most points, first quarter, 24
 Green Bay (10) vs. New England (14), XXXI
Most points, second quarter, 35
 Washington (35) vs. Denver (0), XXII
Most points, third quarter, 24
 Washington (14) vs. Buffalo (10), XXVI
 Baltimore Ravens (7) vs. San Francisco (17), XLVII
Most points, fourth quarter, 37
New England (18) vs. Carolina (19), XXXVIII
Most points, overtime, 6
New England (6) vs. Atlanta (0), LI
Most lead changes, game, 7
Pittsburgh vs. Los Angeles Rams, XIV
Most lead changes in the fourth quarter, 3
New England vs. New York Giants, XLII
Both teams scoring over 30 points, 4
Pittsburgh (35) vs. Dallas (31), XIII
Baltimore Ravens (34) vs. San Francisco (31), XLVII
Philadelphia (41) vs. New England (33), LII
 Kansas City (38) vs. Philadelphia (35), LVII

Touchdowns

Single team
Record holder team listed first.
Most touchdowns, game, 8
San Francisco vs. Denver, XXIV
Most touchdowns, losing team, game,  4
Dallas vs. Pittsburgh, XIII
Carolina vs. New England, XXXVIII
Atlanta vs. New England, LI
New England vs. Philadelphia, LII
Philadelphia vs. Kansas City, LVII
Fewest touchdowns, winning team, game,  1
New York Jets vs. Baltimore Colts, III
New England vs. Los Angeles Rams, LIII
Fewest touchdowns, game,  0
Miami vs. Dallas, VI
Los Angeles Rams vs. New England, LIII
Kansas City Chiefs vs. Tampa Bay, LV
Longest touchdown scoring drive, 96 yards
Chicago vs. New England, XX
Indianapolis vs. New Orleans, XLIV
New England vs. New York Giants, XLVI

Both teams
Most touchdowns, game, 10
 San Francisco (7) vs. San Diego (3), XXIX
Fewest touchdowns, game, 1
New England (1) vs. Los Angeles Rams (0), LIII

Points after touchdown

Single team
Record holder team listed first.
Most (one point) PATs, game, 7
San Francisco vs. Denver, (8 attempts) XXIV
Dallas vs. Buffalo, (7 attempts) XXVII
San Francisco vs. San Diego, (7 attempts) XXIX
Most two point conversions, game, 2
San Diego vs. San Francisco, XXIX
New England vs. Atlanta, LI
Most missed PATs, game, 3
Oakland (3 2pt tries) vs. Tampa Bay, XXXVII
Philadelphia (1 K, 2 2pt tries) vs. New England, LII

Both teams
Most (one point) PATs, game, 9
Pittsburgh (5) vs. Dallas (4), XIII
Dallas (7) vs. Buffalo (2) (XXVII)
Fewest (one point) PATs, game, 1
New England Patriots (1) vs. Los Angeles Rams (0), LIII
Most two point conversions, game,  2
San Diego (2) vs. San Francisco (0), XXIX
New England (2) vs. Atlanta (0), LI
Most total PATs, game, 10
San Diego (2 2 pt, 1 k) vs. San Francisco (7 k), XXIX
Most missed PATs, game, 4
New England (1 K) vs. Philadelphia (1 K, 2 2pt tries), LII

Field goals

Single team
Record holder team listed first.
Most field goals attempted, game, 5
 New York Jets vs. Baltimore Colts, III
Dallas vs. Denver, XII
Most field goals, game,  4
Green Bay vs. Oakland, II
San Francisco vs. Cincinnati, XVI
Most fake field goals attempted, game, 1
 Baltimore Ravens vs. San Francisco 49ers, XLVII

Both teams
Most field goals attempted, game, 7	
New York Jets (5) vs. Baltimore Colts (2), III
San Francisco (4) vs. Cincinnati (3), XXIII
St. Louis (4) vs. Tennessee (3), XXXIV
Denver (4) vs. Atlanta (3), XXXIII
Fewest field goals attempted, game, 1 	 
Minnesota (0) vs. Miami (1), VIII
San Francisco (0) vs. Denver (1), XXIV
Philadelphia (0) vs. New England (1), XXXIX
New England (0) vs. New York Giants (1), XLII
New England (0) vs. Seattle (1), XLIX
Most field goals, game,  5	 
Cincinnati (3) vs. San Francisco (2), XXIII
Dallas (3) vs. Buffalo (2), XXVIII
Baltimore Ravens (2) vs. San Francisco (3), XLVII
New England (2) vs. Philadelphia (3), LII
Most field goals without miss, game, 5
Dallas (3) vs. Buffalo (2), XXVIII
Baltimore Ravens (2) vs. San Francisco (3), XLVII
Fewest field goals, game, 0	
Miami vs. Washington, VII
Pittsburgh vs. Minnesota, IX

Safeties
Record holder team listed first.
Most safeties, game, 1
 Pittsburgh vs. Minnesota, IX
 Pittsburgh vs. Dallas, X
 Chicago vs. New England, XX
 New York Giants vs. Denver, XXI
 Buffalo vs. New York Giants, XXV
 Arizona vs. Pittsburgh, XLIII
 New York Giants vs. New England, XLVI
 San Francisco vs. Baltimore Ravens, XLVII
 Seattle vs. Denver, XLVIII

Offense

Net yards gained
Combined rushing and passing

Single team
Record holder team listed first.
Most net yards, rushing and passing, game, 613
New England vs. Philadelphia, LII
Fewest net yards, rushing and passing, game, 119
Minnesota vs. Pittsburgh, IX
Fewest Total Yards, Winning Team, game, 194
Denver vs. Carolina, 50
Most offensive plays, game, 93
New England vs. Atlanta, LI
Most consecutive drives ending with a punt, game, 8
Los Angeles Rams vs. New England, LIII

Both teams
Most net yards, rushing and passing, game, 1,151
New England (613) vs. Philadelphia (538), LII – all-time NFL record for any game, whether regular-season or postseason
Fewest net yards, rushing and passing, game, 396
New York Giants (152) vs. Baltimore Ravens (244), XXXV

Rushing

Single team
Record holder team listed first.
Most rushing attempts, game, 57
Pittsburgh vs. Minnesota, IX
Fewest rushing attempts, winning team, game, 13
St. Louis Rams vs. Tennessee, XXXIV
Green Bay vs. Pittsburgh XLV
Fewest rushing attempts, game,  9
Miami vs. San Francisco, XIX
Most yards rushing, game, 280
Washington vs. Denver, XXII
Fewest rushing yards, winning team, game,  29
St. Louis Rams vs. Tennessee, XXXIV
Fewest yards rushing, game,  7
New England vs. Chicago, XX
Highest average gain per rush attempt, game, 7.00 yards
Los Angeles Raiders vs. Washington, (33–231), XVIII
Washington vs. Denver, (40–280), XXII
Lowest average gain per rush attempt, game,  0.64 yards
New England vs. Chicago, (11–7) XX
Most rushing touchdowns, game, 4
Chicago vs. New England, XX 
Denver vs. Green Bay, XXXII
Fewest rushing touchdowns, game, 0 (39 teams)
2 times –  Minnesota, Denver, Green Bay, New York Giants, Philadelphia, Cincinnati
3 times – Oakland, Dallas, Miami, St. Louis/Los Angeles Rams
4 times – New England

Both teams
Most rushing attempts, game, 81
Washington (52) vs. Miami (29), XVII
Fewest rushing attempts, game, 36
Green Bay (13) vs. Pittsburgh (23), XLV
Most yards rushing, game, 377
Washington (280) vs. Denver (97), XXII
Fewest yards rushing, game,  91
Arizona (33) vs. Pittsburgh (58), XLIII
Most rushing touchdowns, game, 4
Miami (3) vs. Minnesota (1), VIII 
Chicago (4) vs. New England (0), XX 
San Francisco (3) vs. Denver (1), XXIV
Denver (4) vs. Green Bay (0), XXXII
 Kansas City (1) vs. Philadelphia (3), LVII 
Fewest rushing touchdowns, game,  0
 Pittsburgh vs. Dallas, X
 Oakland vs. Philadelphia, XV
 Cincinnati vs. San Francisco, XXIII
 Cincinnati vs. Los Angeles Rams, LVI

Passing

Single team
Record holder team listed first.
Most passing attempts, game, 63
New England vs. Atlanta, LI
Fewest passing attempts, game,  7
Miami vs. Minnesota, VIII
Most passes completed, game, 43
 New England vs. Atlanta LI
Fewest passes completed, game, 4
Miami vs. Washington, XVII
Highest completion percentage, game (20 attempts),  88.0%
 New York Giants vs. Denver, (25–22), XXI
Lowest completion percentage, game (20 attempts), 32.0%
 Denver vs. Dallas, (25–8), XII
Most yards passing, game, 500
 New England vs. Philadelphia, LII
Fewest yards passing, game, 35
Denver vs. Dallas, XII
Highest average yards gained per pass attempt, game, 14.7 yards
Pittsburgh vs. Los Angeles Rams (309–21), XIV
Lowest average yards gained per pass attempt, game, 1.4 yards
Denver vs. Dallas (35–25), XII
Most times intercepted, game, 5
Oakland vs. Tampa Bay, XXXVII
Most times sacked, game,  7
Dallas vs. Pittsburgh, X
New England vs. Chicago, XX
Carolina vs. Denver, 50
Cincinnati vs. Los Angeles Rams, LVI
Fewest times sacked, game, 0 (14 teams)

2 times – Denver, Philadelphia 
3 times – Baltimore/Indianapolis Colts

Most passing touchdowns, game, 6
San Francisco vs. San Diego, XXIX
Fewest passing touchdowns, game,  0 (24 teams)
2 times – Miami, Washington, Buffalo
3 times – Minnesota
4 times – Denver

Most players, 100-or-more receiving yards, game, 3
New England vs. Philadelphia, LII (Danny Amendola 152, Chris Hogan 128, Rob Gronkowski 116)

Both teams
Most passes attempted, game, 93
San Diego (55) vs. San Francisco (38), XXIX
New England (49) vs. Philadelphia (44), LII
Fewest passes attempted, game, 35
Miami (7) vs. Minnesota (28), VIII
Most passes completed, game, 63
New Orleans (32) vs. Indianapolis (31), XLIV
Fewest passes completed, game, 19
Miami (4) vs. Washington (15), XVII
Highest completion percentage, game, 75.0%
New Orleans (82.1%) vs. Indianapolis (68.9%), XLIV
Most yards passing, game, 874
New England (500) vs. Philadelphia (374), LII
Fewest yards passing, game, 156
Miami (69) vs. Washington (87), VII
Most times sacked, game, 12
Carolina (7) vs. Denver (5), 50
Fewest times sacked, game, 1  
Philadelphia (0) vs. Oakland (1), XV
Denver (0) vs. Green Bay (1), XXXII
New Orleans (1) vs. Indianapolis (0), XLIV
Seattle (0) vs. Denver (1), XLVIII
Philadelphia (0) vs. New England (1), LII
Most passing touchdowns, game, 7
Pittsburgh (4) vs. Dallas (3), XIII
San Francisco (6) vs. San Diego (1), XXIX
New England (3) vs. Philadelphia (4), LII
Fewest passing touchdowns, game, 0
New York Jets vs. Baltimore Colts, III
Miami vs. Minnesota, VIII
Buffalo vs. Dallas, XXVIII
Carolina vs. Denver, 50
New England vs. Los Angeles Rams, LIII

First downs

Single team
Record holder team listed first.
Most first downs, game, 37
New England vs. Atlanta, LI
Fewest first downs, game, 9
Minnesota vs. Pittsburgh, IX
Miami vs. Washington, XVII
Most first downs rushing, game, 16
San Francisco vs. Miami, XIX
Fewest first downs, rushing, game, 1
New England vs. Chicago, XX
St. Louis vs. Tennessee, XXXIV
Oakland vs. Tampa Bay, XXXVII
New England vs. Seattle XLIX
Most first downs, passing, game, 26
New England vs. Atlanta, LI
Fewest first downs, passing, game, 1
Denver vs. Dallas, XII
Most first downs, penalty, game, 6
Tampa Bay vs. Kansas City LV
Most fourth down conversions, game, 2
Kansas City vs. San Francisco, LIV
Philadelphia vs.Kansas City LVII

Both teams
Most first downs, game, 54
New England (37) vs. Atlanta (17), LI
New England (29) vs. Philadelphia (25), LII
Fewest first downs, game, 24
Dallas (10) vs. Baltimore Colts (14), V
New York Giants (11) vs. Baltimore Ravens (13), XXXV
Most first downs, rushing, game, 21
Washington (14) vs. Miami (7), XVII
Fewest first downs, rushing, game, 6
Arizona (2) vs. Pittsburgh (4), XLIII
Most first downs, passing, game, 42
New England (23) vs. Philadelphia (19), LII
Fewest first downs, passing, game, 9
Denver (1) vs. Dallas (8), XII
Most first downs, penalty, game, 9
Tampa Bay (6) vs. Kansas City (3), LV
Fewest first downs, penalty, game, 0
Dallas vs. Miami, VI 
Miami vs. Washington, VII 
Dallas vs. Pittsburgh, X
Miami vs. San Francisco, XIX 
Pittsburgh vs. Seattle, XL
Pittsburgh vs. Green Bay XLV
Lowest 3rd down conversion rate, game, 13.8%
Denver (1–14) vs. Carolina (3–15), 50

Defense

Single team
Record holder team listed first.
Most Interceptions by, game,  5
Tampa Bay vs. Oakland, XXXVII 
Most yards gained by interception return, game, 172
Tampa Bay vs. Oakland, XXXVII 
Most touchdowns scored by interception return, game, 3 
Tampa Bay vs. Oakland, XXXVII 
Most sacks, game, 7
Pittsburgh vs. Dallas, X
Chicago vs. New England, XX
Denver vs. Carolina, 50
Los Angeles Rams vs. Cincinnati, LVI
Fewest yards allowed, 119
Pittsburgh vs. Minnesota, IX
Most yards allowed, 613
Philadelphia vs. New England, LII
Most yards allowed in a win, 613
Philadelphia vs. New England, LII

Both teams
Most Interceptions by, game, 6
Baltimore Colts (3) vs. Dallas (3), V
Tampa Bay (5) vs. Oakland (1), XXXVII
Fewest Interceptions by, game, 0
 Buffalo vs. New York Giants XXV
 St. Louis Rams vs. Tennessee XXXIV
  Kansas City vs. Philadelphia LVII
Fewest yards allowed, 396
Baltimore Ravens (152) vs. New York Giants (244), XXXV
Most yards allowed, 1151
Philadelphia (613) vs. New England (538), LII 
Most yards gained by interception return, game, 184
 Tampa Bay (172) vs. Oakland Raiders (12), XXXVII
Most sacks by, game, 12
Denver (7) vs. Carolina (5), 50
Fewest sacks by, game, 1
Philadelphia (1) vs. New England (0), LII

Fumbles

Single team
Record holder team listed first.
Most fumbles, game, 8
Buffalo vs. Dallas, XXVII
Most fumbles lost, game, 5
Buffalo vs. Dallas, XXVII
Most fumbles recovered, game,  8
Dallas vs. Denver, XII (4 own, 4 opponent)

Both teams
Most fumbles, both teams, game, 12	
Buffalo (8) vs. Dallas (4), XXVII
Fewest fumbles, both teams, game, 0 
Los Angeles Rams vs. Pittsburgh, XIV 
Green Bay vs. New England, XXXI 
Pittsburgh vs. Seattle, XL 
New Orleans vs. Indianapolis, XLIV
New England vs. Seattle XLIX
Cincinnati  vs. Los Angeles Rams LVI
Most fumbles lost, both teams, game, 7	
Buffalo (5) vs. Dallas (2), XXVII
Fewest fumbles lost, both teams, game, 0 (19 times)
2 times – Green Bay, Dallas, Denver, Seattle, San Francisco, Tampa Bay 
3 times – New York Giants, Kansas City
4 times – Pittsburgh, New England, Los Angeles/St. Louis Rams

Turnovers
Turnovers are defined as the number of times losing the ball on interceptions and fumbles.

Single team
Record holder team listed first.
Most turnovers, game, 9
Buffalo vs. Dallas, XXVII
Fewest turnovers, game,  0 (23 teams)
2 times – Oakland, San Francisco
3 times – Green Bay, New York Giants

Both teams
Most turnovers, game, 11
Baltimore Colts (7) vs. Dallas (4), V
Buffalo (9) vs. Dallas (2), XXVII
Fewest turnovers, game, 0
Buffalo vs. New York Giants, XXV
St. Louis Rams vs. Tennessee, XXXIV

Kickoff returns

Single team
Record holder team listed first.
Most kickoff returns, game,  9
Denver vs. San Francisco, XXIV
Oakland vs. Tampa Bay, XXXVII
Fewest kickoff returns, game, 0
Seattle vs. New England XLIX
Cincinnati vs. Los Angeles Rams LVI
Kansas City vs. Philadelphia LVII
Most yards gained, game, 244 
San Diego vs. San Francisco, XXIX
Fewest yards gained, game, 0
Seattle vs. New England XLIX
Cincinnati vs. Los Angeles Rams LVI
Kansas City vs. Philadelphia LVII
Highest average gain, game (3 returns), 44.0 yards
Cincinnati vs. San Francisco, XXIII (3–132)
Most touchdowns, game, 1
Miami vs. Washington, XVII
Cincinnati vs. San Francisco, XXIII
San Diego vs. San Francisco, XXIX
Green Bay vs. New England, XXXI
Atlanta vs. Denver, XXXIII
Baltimore Ravens vs. New York Giants, XXXV
New York Giants vs. Baltimore Ravens, XXXV
Chicago vs. Indianapolis, XLI
Baltimore Ravens vs. San Francisco, XLVII
Seattle vs. Denver, XLVIII

Both teams
Most kickoff returns, game, 13
Oakland (9) vs. Tampa Bay (4), XXXVII
Fewest kickoff returns, game, 1
Cincinnati (0) vs. Los Angeles Rams (1), LVI
Kansas City (0) vs. Philadelphia (1), LVII
Most yards gained, game, 312
Baltimore Ravens (206) vs. San Francisco (106), XLVII
Fewest yards gained, game, 11
Kansas City (0) vs. Philadelphia (11), LVII
Most touchdowns, game, 2
Baltimore Ravens (1) vs. New York Giants (1), XXXV

Punting

Single team
Record holder team listed first.
Most punts, game, 11
New York Giants vs. Baltimore Ravens, XXXV
Fewest punts, game, 0
New England vs. Philadelphia, LII
Highest average, game (4 punts), 50.17 yards
 Seattle vs. Pittsburgh, (6–301), XL
Lowest average, game (4 punts), 31.00 yards
 Tampa Bay vs. Oakland (4–124), XXXVII
Most punts inside the 10 yard line, 3
N Y Giants vs. New England, XLVI

Both teams
Most punts, game, 21
New York Giants (11) vs. Baltimore Ravens (10), XXXV
Fewest punts, game, 1
Philadelphia (1) vs. New England (0), LII

Punt returns

Single team
Record holder team listed first.
Most punt returns, game, 6
Washington vs. Miami, XVII
Green Bay vs. New England, XXXI
Fewest punt returns, game, 0

Most yards gained, game, 90
Green Bay vs. New England, XXXI
Fewest yards gained, game, –1
Dallas vs. Miami, VI
Tennessee vs. St. Louis Rams, XXXIV
Highest average return yardage, game (3 returns), 18.7 yards	 
 San Francisco vs. Cincinnati, (3–56), XXIII

Both teams
Most punt returns, game, 10
Green Bay (6) vs. New England (4), XXXI
Fewest punt returns, game, 0
Denver vs. Green Bay XXXII 
Atlanta vs. Denver, XXXIII
Philadelphia vs. New England, LII
Most yards gained, game, 120
Green Bay (90) vs. New England (30), XXXI
Fewest yards gained, game, 0
Denver vs. Green Bay, XXXII 
Atlanta vs. Denver, XXXIII
Philadelphia vs. New England, LII
Kansas City vs. San Francisco, LIV
Kansas City vs. Tampa Bay LV

Penalties

Single team
Record holder team listed first.
Most penalties, game, 12
Dallas vs. Denver, XII
Carolina vs. New England, XXXVIII
Carolina vs. Denver, 50
Fewest penalties, game, 0
Miami vs. Dallas, VI
Pittsburgh vs. Dallas, X
Denver vs. San Francisco, XXIV
Atlanta vs. Denver, XXXIII
Most yards penalized, game, 133 yards
Dallas vs. Baltimore Colts, V
Fewest yards penalized, game, 0
Miami vs. Dallas, VI
Pittsburgh vs. Dallas, X
Denver vs. San Francisco, XXIV
Atlanta vs. Denver, XXXIII

Both teams
Most penalties, game, 20
Dallas (12) vs. Denver (8), XII
Carolina (12) vs. New England (8), XXXVIII
Fewest penalties, game, 2
Pittsburgh (0) vs. Dallas (2), X
Most yards penalized, game, 164 yards
Dallas (133) vs. Baltimore Colts (31), V
Fewest yards penalized, game, 15 yards
Miami (0) vs. Dallas (15), VI

Time
Fastest score from start of game, (12 seconds)
Seattle Seahawks, safety  (XLVIII)
Least Playing Time In The Lead by winning team, (0 minutes, 0 seconds)
New England Patriots vs. Atlanta Falcons (LI) (did not lead in regulation, achieved winning score in overtime)
Most Playing Time In The Lead by losing team, (41 minutes, 18 seconds)
Atlanta Falcons vs. New England Patriots (LI)
Most Playing Time In The Lead, (59 minutes, 48 seconds)
Seattle Seahawks (XLVIII)
Longest time before first score, team, (57 minutes, 53 seconds) 
Washington Redskins (VII)
Longest time before either team scores, (26 minutes, 55 seconds)
Carolina Panthers vs. New England Patriots (XXXVIII)
Time of Possession, (40 minutes, 33 seconds)
New York Giants (XXV)
Longest drive, (9 minutes, 59 seconds)
New York Giants (XLII)
Longest Super Bowl, elapsed time between kickoff and end of game, 4 hours, 14 minutes (includes 34 minute power outage in the 3rd quarter)
Baltimore Ravens vs. San Francisco (XLVII)
Longest Super Bowl, amount of playing time, 63 minutes, 58 seconds (overtime game)
New England Patriots vs. Atlanta Falcons (LI)
Longest drought without repeat World Champions
 years (the 2004 New England Patriots remain the last repeat World Champions)

Coaching
Most games as head coach, 9
Bill Belichick: New England Patriots (XXXVI, XXXVIII, XXXIX, XLII, XLVI, XLIX, LI, LII, and LIII )

Most Super Bowl wins as head coach, 6
Bill Belichick: New England Patriots (XXXVI, XXXVIII, XXXIX, XLIX, LI, and LIII)

Most appearances as a coach, 12
Bill Belichick – assistant coach New York Giants XXI, XXV, New England XXXI, head coach New England XXXVI, XXXVIII, XXXIX, XLII, XLVI, XLIX, LI, LII, and LIII
 
Most Super Bowl losses, 4
Bud Grant: Minnesota (IV, VIII, IX, and XI)
Don Shula: Baltimore Colts (III), Miami Dolphins (VI, XVII, and XIX)
Marv Levy: Buffalo Bills (XXV, XXVI, XXVII, and XXVIII)
Dan Reeves: Denver Broncos (XXI, XXII, and XXIV), Atlanta Falcons (XXXIII)

Won as a Player and a Coach
Tom Flores: Kansas City (IV), Oakland/Los Angeles Raiders (XV, XVIII)
Mike Ditka: Dallas (VI), Chicago (XX)
Tony Dungy: Pittsburgh (XIII), Indianapolis (XLI)
Doug Pederson: Green Bay (XXXI), Philadelphia (LII)

Played and Coached for the same team in a Super Bowl
Gary Kubiak: Denver Broncos (player XXI, XXII, XXIV, coach 50)

Most teams as head coach,  2
Don Shula: Baltimore Colts, Miami Dolphins 
Dick Vermeil: Philadelphia Eagles, St. Louis Rams
Dan Reeves: Denver Broncos, Atlanta Falcons
Bill Parcells: New York Giants, New England Patriots
Mike Holmgren: Green Bay Packers, Seattle Seahawks
John Fox: Carolina Panthers, Denver Broncos
Andy Reid: Philadelphia Eagles, Kansas City Chiefs

Youngest to win, 36 years, 20 days
Sean McVay: Los Angeles Rams (LVI)

Oldest to win, 68 years, 127 days
Bruce Arians: Tampa Bay Buccaneers (LV)

Most seasons between appearances, 19
Dick Vermeil: Philadelphia Eagles, St. Louis Rams (XV and XXXIV)

Most Super Bowl wins with a different starting quarterback, 3
Joe Gibbs: Washington Redskins XVII (Joe Theismann), XXII, (Doug Williams), XXVI (Mark Rypien)

Teams winning with 3 different head coaches
Dallas Cowboys: Tom Landry (VI, XII), Jimmy Johnson (XXVII, XXVIII), Barry Switzer (XXX)
Pittsburgh Steelers: Chuck Noll (IX, X, XIII, XIV), Bill Cowher (XL), Mike Tomlin (XLIII)
Green Bay Packers: Vince Lombardi (I, II), Mike Holmgren (XXXI), Mike McCarthy (XLV)

Popularity
Most-Watched Television Broadcast, 114.5 million viewers
XLIX Seattle vs. New England- Highest rated broadcast of all time.
Highest stadium audience attendance, 103,985
XIV Los Angeles Rams vs. Pittsburgh Steelers
Lowest stadium audience attendance, 24,835
LV Kansas City Chiefs vs. Tampa Bay Buccaneers (due to the COVID-19 pandemic)
Lowest stadium audience attendance, attendance not restricted, 61,946
I Green Bay Packers vs. Kansas City Chiefs (only Super Bowl not to sell out)

Non-occurrences
In the history of the Super Bowl, the following firsts have yet to occur:
Snow - Super Bowl XLI was the first to feature rain, but snow has yet to fall during a Super Bowl, mainly because the league has purposely placed the game in venues where snow is rare. Only once, Super Bowl XLVIII, has the league awarded the Super Bowl to an outdoor venue where snow is a common occurrence in late January and early February, and that particular game was warmer than usual for that time of year.
An all-wild card matchup (teams who failed to win their divisions) – Ten wild card teams have won conference titles since the AFL–NFL merger, but never two in the same season. The closest the NFL has come to having an all-wild card Super Bowl occurred during the 2010–11 NFL playoffs when the New York Jets, a wild card team, reached the AFC Championship Game where they played the Pittsburgh Steelers. The Steelers beat the Jets 24–19. In the subsequent Super Bowl, the Steelers faced another wild card team, the Green Bay Packers, who beat them 31–25.
A punt return for touchdown - Many kickoffs have been returned for touchdowns, and three blocked punts have been returned for a touchdown.
A shutout – Every Super Bowl participant to date has scored. In seven cases, the offenses have failed to score a touchdown. In four of those cases, the special teams scored the only touchdown:
Super Bowl VI: The Miami Dolphins finished with 3 points, tied for the fewest points by a single team in a Super Bowl to date (and making them one of three teams to date to fail to score a touchdown).
Super Bowl VII: The Washington Redskins, after blocking a field goal attempt, returned a fumble on an attempted pass by the Miami Dolphins kicker, Garo Yepremian, for a touchdown and converted the extra point with 2:07 remaining in the game.
Super Bowl IX: The Minnesota Vikings recovered a blocked punt in the end zone but did not convert the extra point with 10:33 left in the game.
Super Bowl XXIII: The Cincinnati Bengals scored on a 93-yard kickoff return with extra point in the third quarter and kicked 3 field goals throughout the game.
Super Bowl XXXV: The New York Giants scored on a 97-yard kickoff return and converted the extra point in the third quarter.
Super Bowl LIII: The Los Angeles Rams scored only three points on a field goal versus the New England Patriots (tying the Miami Dolphins’ record for fewest points in a game originally set in Super Bowl VI).
Super Bowl LV: The Kansas City Chiefs scored three field goals but no touchdowns.
Two teams from the same metropolitan area - Two cities currently have two franchises: New York hosts both the Giants and the Jets, and Los Angeles hosts both the Chargers and the Rams. In addition, the Baltimore Ravens and the Washington Commanders share a common metropolitan area, although they are based in different cities. All of the teams mentioned above except for the Chargers have won a Super Bowl, but never against their neighbor.
Super Bowl XLI between the Indianapolis Colts and Chicago Bears represents the geographically closest teams, separated by only .
One game involved teams from the same state: Super Bowl XXIX involved the San Francisco 49ers and the San Diego Chargers. Super Bowl XXV involved the Buffalo Bills of New York and the New York Giants, who also historically and nominally represented the state but were by this point based in New Jersey.
An appearance by every team – Four teams have yet to reach their first Super Bowl: the Cleveland Browns, Detroit Lions, Houston Texans and Jacksonville Jaguars. The Lions and Browns both won NFL championships in the pre-Super Bowl era, most recently in 1957 and 1964, respectively. The Jaguars and Texans are post-merger expansion teams that began play in 1995 and 2002, respectively.
Every team winning – 12 teams have yet to win their first Super Bowl: the Arizona Cardinals, Atlanta Falcons, Buffalo Bills, Carolina Panthers, Cincinnati Bengals, Los Angeles Chargers, Minnesota Vikings, and Tennessee Titans, along with the four that have not appeared in a Super Bowl. The Chargers, the Titans (known as the Houston Oilers in the 1960s), and the Bills all won American Football League (AFL) championships in the pre-Super Bowl era. The Cardinals, Browns and the Lions have won NFL championships in the pre-Super Bowl era. The Vikings won the 1969 NFL Championship Game, the last NFL Championship Game before the AFL–NFL merger, but lost Super Bowl IV to the AFL champions, the Kansas City Chiefs. Since the merger, the Vikings have appeared in the Super Bowl three more times (Super Bowl VIII, Super Bowl IX, and most recently in Super Bowl XI) but lost all three of them. Thus the Jaguars, Texans, Bengals, Falcons, and Panthers have yet to win their first league championship.
Every team losing – The Baltimore Ravens, New Orleans Saints, New York Jets, Tampa Bay Buccaneers, and the four teams that have never reached a Super Bowl have yet to lose a Super Bowl.
No touchdowns scored – In every Super Bowl to date, there has been at least one touchdown scored (Fewest combined – 1, in Super Bowl LIII).
A three-peat. Two teams (the New England Patriots and the Dallas Cowboys) won three Super Bowl titles in four years and the Pittsburgh Steelers won 4 Super Bowl titles in 6 years, which included back to back championships twice. The Miami Dolphins appeared in three consecutive Super Bowls from 1971–1973, winning the final two, making them the team having come closest to a three-peat. New England did the same from 2016-2018, winning the first and the last Super Bowls of three appearances. The Green Bay Packers were the 1965 NFL Champions and won the first two Super Bowls following their victories in the 1966 and 1967 NFL Championship Games. The Buffalo Bills appeared in four consecutive Super Bowls, but lost every time. The closest a two-time defending champ came to making it back to the Super Bowl for a 3rd straight title shot were the 1976 Pittsburgh Steelers, 1990 San Francisco 49ers and 1994 Dallas Cowboys, who all lost in the conference championship games.
Fair catch kick – A fair catch kick has never been attempted in the Super Bowl. The only scenario in which a fair catch kick was seriously considered was at the end of regulation in Super Bowl LI, when New England Patriots head coach Bill Belichick considered a 75-yard fair catch kick attempt.  Belichick decided against it, however, since the kick would not have had a realistic chance of success and could have been returned by the Atlanta Falcons for a game-winning touchdown.
 A head coach leading two different teams to Super Bowl victories. Five Super Bowl-winning coaches also coached another team but lost: Don Shula, Bill Parcells, Mike Holmgren, Dick Vermeil and Andy Reid.

References
General

Specific

External links
Super Bowl Records
Pro Football Reference

Records
Super Bowl records
National Football League lists